Sholaye-e Inquilab ('Flame of the Revolution') was a Tajik Persian weekly newspaper published from Samarkand, Turkestan Autonomous Soviet Republic between April 1919 and December 1921. The newspaper was founded by Sayyed Reza Alizadeh. The first issue of Sholaye-e Inquilab was published on April 10, 1919. It was the second Tajik Persian newspaper founded (following Bukharai-ye-sharif), and the first Tajik Persian newspaper founded in Soviet Turkestan. The newspaper disseminated the ideological line of the Communist Party of Turkestan.

Most of the articles in the newspaper were authored by Alizadeh himself, albeit he used various pen names to conceal the lack of writers. The newspaper called for the creation of a Persian national identity on linguistic lines. Publishing of Sholaye-e Inquilab was discontinued in October 1919. The newspaper had failed to reach 1,000 readers, and the income from its sales did not match the costs of running it. The Samarkand branch of the Communist Party felt unable to continue supporting it economically.

In November 1919 the newspaper was re-launched, by the Turkkommissiya based in Tashkent. During this period the newspaper was joined by Sadriddin Ayni and Haji Mu'in, both prominent writers at the time. The issue of Persian national identity was no longer emphasized, instead the new writers would prefer to talk about 'Turkestanis'. It continued to refer to its language as 'Persian' though. The newspaper condemned the regime of the Amir and called for support to the Red Army.

Albeit being the sole Persian-language publication in the area, the newspaper continued to fail to gain a wider readership. The newspaper was closed down in December 1921, after its ninetieth issue. Not until August 1924 did a new Tajik newspaper appear (Awaz-e Tajik-e Kambaghal), with Alizadeh, Mu'in and Ayni in its editorial team.

References

Newspapers established in 1919
1921 disestablishments
Samarkand
Defunct weekly newspapers
Turkestan
Communist newspapers
Publications disestablished in 1921
Persian-language newspapers